Marcello Bertinetti (26 April 1885 – 31 July 1967) was an Italian fencer. He competed in sabre and épée events at the 1908, 1924 and 1928 Summer Olympics and won four team medals. Individually he won a silver medal in the épée at the 1929 World Championships.

Bertinetti did not compete between 1911 and 1922 when he served as a medical doctor in Libya. Earlier he played football and won the national title in 1908. His son Franco and grandson Marcello also became Olympic fencers.

References

External links
 

1885 births
1967 deaths
Italian male fencers
Olympic fencers of Italy
Fencers at the 1908 Summer Olympics
Fencers at the 1924 Summer Olympics
Fencers at the 1928 Summer Olympics
Olympic gold medalists for Italy
Olympic silver medalists for Italy
Olympic bronze medalists for Italy
Olympic medalists in fencing
People from Vercelli
Medalists at the 1908 Summer Olympics
Medalists at the 1924 Summer Olympics
Medalists at the 1928 Summer Olympics
Sportspeople from the Province of Vercelli